Middleton railway station may refer to:
Middleton railway station, Greater Manchester
Middleton Junction railway station, Greater Manchester
Middleton railway station, South Australia
Middleton North railway station, Northumberland, England
Middleton railway station, New Zealand

See also 
Midleton railway station, County Cork, Ireland